Bertil Johnsson (23 December 1915 – 2010) was a leading Swedish long and triple jumper of the 1940s. He had his best results in the triple jump, in which he won the national title in 1943 and a silver medal at the 1946 European Athletics Championships.

References

1915 births
2010 deaths
Swedish male triple jumpers
European Athletics Championships medalists